The Dixie Dead is the fifth studio album released by horror punk musician Wednesday 13. It was released on February 19, 2013.

Album Information
Like many of Wednesday albums it features many references and puns relating to horror. "Blood Sucker" is vampire related. The song "Get Your Grave On" may be a pun on "Get Ur Freak On" by Missy Elliott or the phrase "Get Your Game On". "Too Fast for Blood" is clearly a pun on Too Fast for Love by Mötley Crüe, a band Wednesday is a big fan of. "Hail Ming" is based around the character Ming the Merciless from Flash Gordon. "Coming Attractions" and "The Dixie Dead" are possibly based on the film Two Thousand Maniacs! due to the similar plots..

"Carol Anne...They're Here" is based on the character Carol Anne Freeling from the Poltergeist film series. The title also featuring her famous quote "They're Here". "Hands of the Ripper" is a clear reference to the film Hands of the Ripper.

Track listing

Limited edition pre-orders
Limited editions of the album were available as pre-orders on Wednesday's official "Morgue Than Merch" webstore until November 13, 2012, through the Wednesday 13 web shop that contained the same track listing but different artwork and in a DVD case. Wednesday also offered fans the opportunity to have their name in the booklet.

Personnel
Wednesday 13 - lead vocals, keyboards
Roman Surman - lead guitar, backing vocals
Jack Tankersley - rhythm guitar, backing vocals
Troy Doebbler - bass, backing vocals
Jason "Shakes" West - drums

References

2013 albums
Wednesday 13 albums